Adetomyrma caputleae is a species of ant belonging to the genus Adetomyrma. They are endemic to Madagascar, where they are widespread.

The species was recently described by Yoshimurea & Fisher in 2012. Ants of this species are blind.

References

Amblyoponinae
Blind animals
Insects described in 2012
Hymenoptera of Africa
Endemic fauna of Madagascar